Eckerson is a surname. Notable people with the surname include:

 Clarence Eckerson (born 1967), American videographer
 Sophia Eckerson ( 1880–1954), American botanist and microchemist

See also
 Eckerson House